Thomas Johnson Westropp (16 August 18609 April 1922) was an Irish antiquarian, folklorist and archaeologist.

Career 
Westropp was born on 16 August 1860 at Attyflin Park, Patrickswell, County Limerick. His relatives were landowners of English origin and had lived there since the mid 16th century. He displayed an early interest in antiquities, making notes on topography, ancient buildings and folk life whenever his family would make trips into the neighbouring counties.

He attended Trinity College at the University of Dublin and graduated in 1882 with an MA. A degree in civil engineering followed in 1885, at which time he was apprenticed to Bindon Blood Stoney, who was engaged in a project to widen and dredge the entrance to the Port of Dublin. After he finished his training, Westropp became the assistant surveyor for County Meath, but soon abandoned his professional work to pursue his archaeological interests. He spent the remainder of his life researching antiquities along the western seaboard.

He drew many detailed sketches of buildings, grave slabs and other archaeological remains throughout Ireland. Many of these sketches are held by the Royal Irish Academy.  His publications are widely available in libraries throughout the west of Ireland.

County Clare

Folklore

While surveying the field monuments of County Clare, he became fascinated by the variety and descriptiveness of the folk tales he heard being recited by the locals. Over the course of several years, he gathered these tales, beliefs and customs and published them in a series of articles which appeared in "Folk-Lore: Transactions of the Folk-Lore Society" between 1910 and 1913. In 2006 these folk-tales were published on the internet by the County Clare Library. Many of these tales have since been lost to living memory. His writings later provided the foundation for the work of the Irish Folklore Commission.

The Normans and prehistoric sites

Westropp also undertook research into the early history of Clare and Limerick (which the Normans called Thomond) and published his finding in three historical essays covering the years 1275–1287, 1287–1313 and 1313–1318, respectively. He then focused on the palaces of early Killaloe, other prehistoric stone-forts and the 'peel towers'or tower houses, eventually publishing several articles about his findings.

Publications

County Clare

 

Prehistory
 

reprinted as 

 

 
 
 

  in : 

 
Folklore

 
reprint of  A Folklore Survey of County Clare and County Clare Folk-Tales and Myths, published 1910/1913 in Folk Lore :  Transactions of the Folklore Society.
Ecclesiastical 

 
 

  

 

Fortifications

Other
 
 [reprint]

References

External links
 

Irish archaeologists
Irish writers
1860 births
1922 deaths
Irish antiquarians
Castellologists